This is the Preliminary Round of the Copa Libertadores 2007 tournament. A total of 12 teams played in a two-legged round with 6 teams proceeding to the next round. Team 1 played the first leg at home. The away goals rule was employed in this round. The preliminary round was played between January 24 and February 7.

  
|}

Matches

First leg

Second Leg

Santos advanced on points 6–0.

Vélez Sarsfield advanced on points 4–2.

Deportivo Tolima advanced on points 4–1.

LDU Quito advanced on points 4–1.

Parana advanced on points 3–1.

América advanced on points 6–2.

References
RSSSF
Official Site Copa Libertadores

Preliminary Round